The presence of Peruvians in Italy dates back to the 1980s.

Numbers
In 2019, Italy had 97.128 regular immigrants from Peru. In 2006, they were 66,506. The three cities with the highest number of Peruvians are: Milan, Rome and Turin.

History

Notable people

See also
Italian Peruvians
Italy-Peru relations
Immigration to Italy

References

History of Peru
Ethnic groups in Italy
 
Italy